Tommy Uolevi Ekblom (born 20 September 1959 in Porvoo) is a retired long-distance runner from Finland. He twice competed for his native country at the Summer Olympics (1980 and 1984) in the men's 3000 metres steeplechase. Ekblom set his personal best (8.19.40) in that event in 1983. He also coached Jukka Keskisalo, another Finnish steeplechaser, who became the European Champion in 2006.

References

1959 births
Living people
People from Porvoo
Finnish male long-distance runners
Finnish male steeplechase runners
Olympic athletes of Finland
Athletes (track and field) at the 1980 Summer Olympics
Athletes (track and field) at the 1984 Summer Olympics
Universiade medalists in athletics (track and field)
Universiade silver medalists for Finland
Medalists at the 1981 Summer Universiade
Sportspeople from Uusimaa